Roseli Aparecida Machado (27 December 1968 – 8 April 2021) was a Brazilian long-distance runner.

Biography
She finished 26th at the 1994 World Cross Country Championships, 48th at the 1995 World Cross Country Championships and 7th at the 1995 New York Marathon. She competed in the women's 5000 metres at the 1996 Summer Olympics, but did not progress from the heats. At the end of this year, she won the women's event at the Saint Silvester Road Race.

She died from COVID-19 in Curitiba on 8 April 2021, at the age of 52.

References

External links
 

1968 births
2021 deaths
Brazilian female long-distance runners
Brazilian female marathon runners
Athletes (track and field) at the 1996 Summer Olympics
Olympic athletes of Brazil
Deaths from the COVID-19 pandemic in Paraná (state)
Sportspeople from São Paulo (state)
21st-century Brazilian women
20th-century Brazilian women